Carlos Henrique Baqueta Fávaro (born 18 October 1969) is a Brazilian farmer and politician. In April 2018, he resigned from the office of Vice Governor of Mato Grosso.

Biography
He embarked on a political career after years of work in the agribusiness, where he had become Vice President of the Soy Producers Association of Brazil (Aprosoja Brasil) in 2010 and President in 2012. He had also presided the Agroindustrial Cooperative of Lucas do Rio Verde (Cooperbio Verde) from 2007 to 2011. Fávaro was also delegate in the Soy and Corn Producers Association of Mato Grosso (Aprosoja).

In the 2014 elections, as a member of the Progressive Party (PP), he was elected Vice Governor of Mato Grosso in the first round, in a ticket led by Pedro Taques (PSDB), receiving 57.25% of the valid votes.

In 2020, after the removal of Selma Arruda from the Federal Senate, Fávaro will temporarily assume her seat as senator. He earned the right to serve the remainder of the term Arruda was elected to serve in, through 31 January 2027, as, in November 2020, he won a special election to the seat she vacated.

References

External links
 
 
 

1969 births
Living people
Social Democratic Party (Brazil, 2011) politicians
Progressistas politicians
People from Paraná (state)
Agriculture ministers of Brazil